Richard H. Kindig (February 2, 1916 – April 7, 2008) was an American photographer who specialized in photographing the rail transport industry in Colorado.

Kindig began photographing the railroads of Colorado in August 1933, and documented the change from steam to diesel locomotives throughout the state.  He was most known for his photographs of the narrow gauge railways of the state.  Kindig was the first recipient of the Railway and Locomotive Historical Society's Photography Award in 1984. On March 1, 2008, the Colorado Railroad Museum honored his work in a special ceremony attended by Colorado Governor Bill Ritter; the Governor declared the day Richard H. Kindig Day in honor of his work. That ceremony was his last public appearance.

He was interred at Fort Logan National Cemetery, Englewood, Colorado.

References

Further reading 
 

1916 births
2008 deaths
20th-century American photographers
American people in rail transportation
People from Colorado
Rail transport photographers
Burials at Fort Logan National Cemetery